Atique Ahmed (born 10 August 1962) is an Indian gangster and ex MP and MLA from Samajwadi Party. He was elected as a member of the legislative assembly from the Allahabad west seat for 5 consecutive terms which is a record. From 2004–2009, he was elected as a Samajwadi Party candidate for the 14th Lok Sabha from Phulpur in Uttar Pradesh.  Between the years 1999-2003, he was the president of the Apna Dal, founded by Sone Lal Patel.
According to his affidavit in the 2014 elections, he has declared that there are now no cases pending against him.  The most sensational murder was that of BSP MLA Raju Pal, who had defeated Atique's brother Ashraf in the 2004 Uttar Pradesh state legislature elections.

Ahmed has fought several elections from jail while being lodged under various charges. On 15 December 2016, he was arrested once again for assaulting staff of the Sam Higginbottom University of Agriculture, Technology and Sciences.

Early and personal life
Atique is married to Shaista Praveen. The couple has five sons- Ali , Umar Ahmad, Asad, Ahzaan and Abaan. Atique's brother Khalid Azim alias Ashraf is an ex-MLA.

2009 General Elections

In the 2009 General Elections, Atique Ahmad was allowed to run for election (since he was yet to be convicted in any case).  However, the Samajwadi Party expelled him in the year 2008, and Mayawati refused him a ticket under BSP,. Later, he contested in elections as a candidate from Apna Dal party from Pratapgarh only to lose the election.

Elections in 2012 and 2014

In Uttar Pradesh Elections 2012, Ahmed contested under the Apna Dal banner from the Allahabad (West) constituency.  He filed his nomination from jail.  He appealed for bail in Allahabad High Court but 10 judges refused to hear the case.  The 11th judge finally took up the matter and he was released on bail before the Elections. However, the seat went to Raju Pal's widow, Puja Pal.

In 2014, he was taken back into the Samajwadi Party and fought the National Elections from the Shrawasti (Lok Sabha constituency).  He managed to secure a quarter of the votes but lost by nearly a lakh votes to Daddan Mishra of the BJP.

Deadly attack on Atique

SHUATS assault case
On December 14, 2016, Atique and his henchmen allegedly assaulted the staff members of Sam Higginbottom University of Agriculture, Technology and Sciences for taking action against two students who were debarred from taking examinations after they were caught cheating. The video of Atiq Ahmad beating the SHUATS teacher and employees was widely circulated on the internet. On February 10, 2017, the Allahabad High Court  summoned the criminal history of Atiq and also directed the Superintendent of police of Allahabad to arrest all the accused in the case. The police arrested Atiq on February 11 after which he was remanded to 14-day judicial custody.

Kidnapping and torturing a businessman in Deoria jail 
Atique Ahmed was shifted to Bareilly jail after being accused of kidnapping and assaulting a businessman Mohit Jaiswal in Deoria Jail. Mohit told media that Atiq Ahmed's gang was asking him to pay extortion money. He was taken to the Deoria jail later for not paying the extortion money. Mohit was beaten up by the jail police guards and other goons. After the news was spread, Uttar Pradesh government shifted Atique to Bareilly Jail and suspended accused jail guards immediately. A call recording was also released in which Atique was threatening Mohit to pay extortion money or else he will be attacked.

Two other businessmen also accused Ahmed of kidnapping and assaulting them in Deoria Jail.

Ahmed was shifted from the Prayagraj Central Jail to the Sabarmati Jail in Ahmedabad in June 2019.

Positions held 
Atique Ahmed has been elected as 5 times MLA and 1 time Lok Sabha MP.

References 

 CBI puts up posters of Atiq Ahmad’s fugitive son Mod Umar in Allahabad | Allahabad News - Times of India

21st-century Indian Muslims
1962 births
Living people
Samajwadi Party politicians
Politicians from Allahabad
India MPs 2004–2009
Uttar Pradesh MLAs 2002–2007
Criminals from Uttar Pradesh
Apna Dal politicians
Lok Sabha members from Uttar Pradesh
All India Majlis-e-Ittehadul Muslimeen politicians